"When It's Gone" is a song written by Jimmie Fadden and Don Schlitz, and recorded by American country music group Nitty Gritty Dirt Band. It was released in October 1989 as the third single from their compilation album Will the Circle Be Unbroken: Volume Two. The song reached number 10 on the Billboard Hot Country Singles & Tracks chart. It was the band's last top 10 hit.

Chart performance

References

1989 singles
Nitty Gritty Dirt Band songs
Songs written by Don Schlitz
1989 songs
Universal Records (1988) singles